Fortson is a surname. Notable people with the surname include:

Benjamin W. Fortson Jr. (1904–1979), former Secretary of State of Georgia
Benjamin W. Fortson IV, American linguist
Bettiola Heloise Fortson (1890–1917), poet, suffragist, and civil rights activist
Danny Fortson (born 1976), American professional basketball player
Jody Fortson (born 1997), American football player
Lucy Fortson, American astronomer
Sheila Fortson (born 1983), American television journalist, model, and writer

See also
Fortson, Georgia